Marc A. Brackett is a research psychologist and the Founding Director of the Yale Center for Emotional Intelligence and Professor in the Child Study Center at Yale University.

Biography
Brackett earned his Ph.D. in psychology from the University of New Hampshire in 2003, where he was supervised by emotional intelligence scholar John D. Mayer. He was a postdoctoral fellow at Yale University with Mayer's collaborator, Peter Salovey.

Academic career
Brackett's research focuses on the role of emotional intelligence in learning, decision making, relationship quality, and mental health; the measurement of emotional intelligence; best practices for bringing emotional intelligence into schools and organizations; and the influences of emotional intelligence training on student and educator effectiveness, bullying prevention, and school climate.

He is the author, co-author, and editor of over 125 scholarly publications and the developer of two university courses on emotional intelligence. His most recent book is Permission to Feel: Unlocking the Power of Emotions to Help Our Kids, Ourselves, and Our Society Thrive.

RULER
Brackett is the lead developer of RULER, an evidence-based approach to social emotional learning that has been approved by CASEL (Collaborative for Academic, Social, and Emotional Learning). The acronym RULER refers to the five key emotion skills of Recognizing, Understanding, Labeling, Expressing, and Regulating emotions. RULER intends to increase personal wellbeing, effective teaching and leadership, academic achievement, and classroom emotional climate change.  An essential aspect of RULER is that it involves training for educational leaders, teachers, support staff, students and families. To date, RULER has been adopted by 2009 schools across the globe, reaching over 1,000,000 students.

Publications

The RULER approach to social and emotional learning 
 Brackett, M. A., & Kremenitzer, J. P., with Maurer, M., Carpenter, M., Rivers, S. E., & Elbertson, N. (Eds.). (2011). Creating emotionally literate classrooms: An introduction to The RULER Approach to Social and Emotional Learning. Portchester, New York: National Professional Resources.
 Brackett, M. A., Rivers, S. E., Reyes, M. R., & Salovey, P. (in press). Enhancing academic performance and social and emotional competence with the RULER Feeling Words Curriculum. Learning and Individual Differences.
 Rivers, S. E., Brackett, M. A., Reyes, M. R., & Salovey, P. (in press). Improving the social and emotional climate of classrooms: A clustered randomized controlled trial testing The RULER Approach. Prevention Science.
 Reyes, M. R., Brackett, M. A., Rivers, S. E., Elbertson, N.,  & Salovey, P. (in press). The interaction effects of program training, dosage, and implementation quality on targeted student outcomes for The RULER Approach to social and emotional learning, School Psychology Review.
 Brackett, M. A., Patti, J., Stern, R., Rivers, S. E., Elbertson, N., Chisholm, C., & Salovey, P. (2009). A sustainable, skill-based model to building emotionally literate schools. In R. Thompson, M. Hughes, & J. B. Terrell (Eds.), Handbook of developing emotional and social intelligence: Best practices, case studies, and tools (pp. 329–358). New York: John Wiley & Sons, Inc.
 Rivers, S. E., & Brackett, M. A. (2011). Achieving standards in the English language arts (and more) using The RULER Approach to Social and Emotional Learning. Reading and Writing Quarterly, 27, 75–100.''

Classroom climate
 Brackett, M. A., Reyes, M. R., Rivers, S. E., Elbertson, N. E., & Salovey, P. (2011). Classroom Emotional Climate, Teacher Affiliation, and Student Conduct. Journal of Classroom Interactions, 46, 27–46.
 Reyes, M. R., Brackett, M. A., Rivers, S. E., White, M., Mashburn, A. J., & Salovey, P. (in press). Classroom emotional climate, student engagement, and academic achievement, Journal of Educational Psychology.

Emotional intelligence and its applications
 Brackett, M. A., Rivers, S. E., & Salovey, P. (2011). Emotional intelligence: Personal, Social, Educational, and Workplace Implications. Social and Personality Psychology Compass, 5, 88–103.
 Brackett, M. A., Palomera, R., Mojsa, J., Reyes, M., & Salovey, P. (2010). Emotion regulation ability, job satisfaction, and burnout among British secondary school teachers. Psychology in the Schools, 47, 406–417.
 Rivers, S. E., Brackett, M. A., Cook, M., Omori, M., Sickler, C., & Salovey, P. (in press). Emotion skills as a protective factor for risky behaviors among college students. Journal of College Student Development.
 Brackett, M. A., Rivers, S., Shiffman, S., Lerner, N., & Salovey, P. (2006). Relating emotional abilities to social functioning: A comparison of performance and self-report measures of emotional intelligence. Journal of Personality and Social Psychology, 91, 780–795.
 Brackett, M. A., & Mayer, J. D. (2003). Convergent, discriminant, and incremental validity of competing measures of emotional intelligence. Personality and Social Psychology Bulletin, 29, 1147–1158.

Assessment
 Brackett, M. A., Reyes, M. R., Rivers, S. E., Elbertson, N., & Salovey, P. (in press). Assessing teachers' beliefs about social and emotional learning. Journal of Psychoeducational Assessment.
 Brackett, M. A., & Geher, G. (2006). Measuring emotional intelligence: Paradigmatic shifts and common ground. In J. Ciarrochi, J. P. Forgas & J. D. Mayer (Eds.), Emotional intelligence and everyday life (2nd ed.) (pp. 27–50). New York, NY: Psychology Press.
 Brackett, M. A., & Salovey, P. (2004). Measuring emotional intelligence as a mental ability with the Mayer-Salovey-Caruso Emotional Intelligence Test. In G. Geher (Ed.), Measurement of Emotional Intelligence (pp. 179–194). Hauppauge, NY: Nova Science Publishers.

Recognition

Much of Brackett's research is being extended to different cultures, including England, Spain, Italy, Australia, and China. In 2009, his work on social emotional learning (SEL) earned him the Joseph E. Zins Award. He received the 2004/2007 award for Excellence in Research, MENSA Education and Research Foundation. In 2017 he was awarded an honorary doctorate from Manhattanville College.

Currently, he is a consultant to Facebook on a large-scale research project designed to both prevent and decrease online bullying.

See also 
 Paul Ekman
 Daniel Cordaro
 Dacher Keltner
 Emotionally focused therapy

References

External links 
 Profile — Yale Center for Emotional Intelligence

Yale University faculty
21st-century American psychologists
University of New Hampshire alumni
Emotional intelligence academics
Living people
Year of birth missing (living people)